George Francis Roesch (June 19, 1855 New York City – December 21, 1917 The Bronx, New York City) was an American lawyer and politician from New York.

Life
He attended St. Nicholas Parochial School, De La Salle Institute, and Columbia Law School. He was admitted to the bar in 1876, and practiced in New York City. He married Frances Lederle, and they had three sons.

He was a member of the New York State Assembly (New York Co., 10th D.) in 1883, 1885, 1888 and 1889.

He was a member of the New York State Senate (7th D.) from 1890 to 1893, sitting in the 113th, 114th, 115th and 116th New York State Legislatures.

He was Justice of the Fourth District Municipal Court from 1894 to 1909. In 1909, he ran for the City Court, but was defeated. In 1910, he was appointed Second Deputy State Fire Marshal, and later that year First Deputy. He was Assistant New York County District Attorney from 1916 until his death.

He died on December 21, 1917, in St. Francis Hospital in the Bronx, New York City, of "stomach disease".

Sources
The New York Red Book compiled by Edgar L. Murlin (published by James B. Lyon, Albany NY, 1897; pg. 403f, 502, 504 and 506f)
Fourth Annual Record of Assemblymen and Senators from the City of New York in the State Legislature published by the City Reform Club (1889; pg. 44ff)
Biographical sketches of the members of the Legislature in The Evening Journal Almanac (1891)
TAMMANY NAMES ITS COUNTY TICKET in NYT on October 6, 1909
GEO. F. ROESCH DIES; EX-STATE SENATOR in NYT on December 22, 1917

1855 births
1917 deaths
Democratic Party New York (state) state senators
Politicians from New York City
Democratic Party members of the New York State Assembly
Columbia Law School alumni
New York (state) state court judges
Lawyers from New York City
19th-century American judges
19th-century American lawyers